The Palace of Aachen was a group of buildings with residential, political and religious purposes chosen by Charlemagne to be the centre of power of the Carolingian Empire. The palace was located at the north of the current city of Aachen, today in the German Land of North Rhine-Westphalia. Most of the Carolingian palace was built in the 790s but the works went on until Charlemagne's death in 814. The plans, drawn by Odo of Metz, were part of the programme of renovation of the kingdom decided by the ruler. Today much of the palace is destroyed, but the Palatine Chapel has been preserved and is considered as a masterpiece of Carolingian architecture and a characteristic example of architecture from the Carolingian Renaissance.

Historical context

The palace before Charlemagne 

In ancient times, the Romans chose the site of Aachen for its thermal springs and its forward position towards Germania. The Roman city grew in connection with the thermae according to a classical grid plan similar to that of Roman legions' camps. A palace was used to accommodate the governor of the province or the Emperor. In the 4th century, the city and the palace were destroyed during the Barbarian invasions. Clovis made Paris the capital of the Frankish Kingdom, and Aachen Palace was abandoned until the advent of the Carolingian dynasty. The Pippinid Mayors of the Palace carried out some restoration works, but it was at the time only one residence among others. The Frankish court was itinerant and the rulers moved according to the circumstances. Around 765, Pepin the Short had a palace erected over the remains of the old Roman building; he had the thermae restored and removed its pagan idols. As soon as he came to power in 768, Charlemagne spent time in Aachen as well as in other villas in Austrasia. In the 790s, he decided to settle down in order to govern his kingdom, then his empire more efficiently.

The choice of Aachen 

The site of Aachen was chosen by Charlemagne after careful consideration in a key moment of his reign. Since his advent as King of the Franks, Charlemagne had led numerous military expeditions that had both filled his treasury and enlarged his realm, most notably towards the East. He conquered pagan Saxony in 772–780, but this area resisted and the war with the Saxons lasted for about thirty years. Charlemagne ended the Germanic custom of an itinerant court moving from place to place and established a real capital. As he was ageing, he decreased the frequency of military expeditions and, after 806, virtually did not leave Aachen.

Aachen's geographic location was a decisive factor in Charlemagne's choice: the place was situated in the Carolingian heartlands of Austrasia, the cradle of his family, East of the Meuse river, at a crossroads of land roads and on a tributary of the Rur, called the Wurm. From then, Charlemagne left the administration of the Southern regions to his son Louis, named King of Aquitaine, which enabled him to reside in the North.

Besides, settling down in Aachen enabled Charlemagne to control from closer the operations in Saxony. Charlemagne also considered other advantages of the place: surrounded with forest abounding in game, he intended to abandon himself to hunting in the area. The ageing emperor could also benefit from Aachen's hot springs.

The scholars of the Carolingian era presented Charlemagne as the "New Constantine"; in this context, he needed a capital and a palace worthy of the name. He left Rome to the Pope. The rivalry with the Byzantine Empire led Charlemagne to build a magnificent palace. The fire that destroyed his palace in Worms in 793 also encouraged him to follow such a plan.

Importance of the project entrusted to Odo of Metz 

Historians know almost nothing about the architect of the Palace of Aachen, Odo of Metz. His name appears in the works of Eginhard (c. 775–840), Charlemagne's biographer. He is supposed to have been an educated cleric, familiar with liberal arts, especially quadrivia. He had probably read Vitruvius' treatise on architecture, De Architectura.

The decision to build the palace was taken in the late 780s or the early 790s, before Charlemagne held the title of emperor. Works began in 794 and went on for several years. Aachen quickly became the favourite residence of the sovereign. After 807, he almost did not leave it any more. In the absence of sufficient documentation, it is impossible to know the number of workers employed, but the dimensions of the building make it probable that there were many of them.

The geometry of the plan chosen was very simple: Odo of Metz decided to keep the layout of the Roman roads and inscribe the square in 360 Carolingian feet, or 120 metres-side square. The square enclosed an area of 50 acres divided in four parts by a North-South axis (the stone gallery) and an East-West axis (the former Roman road, the decumanus). To the north of this square lay the council hall, to the south the Palatine Chapel. The architect drew a triangle toward the East to connect the thermae to the palace complex. The two best-known buildings are the council hall (today disappeared) and the Palatine Chapel, included into the Cathedral. The other buildings are hardly identified. Often built in timber framing, made of wood and brick, they have been destroyed. Lastly, the palace complex was surrounded with a wall.

The arrival of the court in Aachen and the construction work stimulated the activity in the city that experienced growth in the late 8th century and the early 9th century, as craftsmen, traders and shopkeepers had settled near the court. Some important ones lived in houses inside the city. The members of the Palace Academy and Charlemagne's advisors such as Eginhard and Angilbert owned houses near the palace.

Council Hall 

Located at the North of the Palace complex, the great Council Hall (aula regia or aula palatina in Latin) was used to house the speeches delivered by the Emperor once a year. This occasion gathered the highest officials in the Carolingian Empire, dignitaries and the hierarchy of the power: counts, vassals of the king, bishops and abbots. The general assembly was usually held in May. Participants discussed important political and legal affairs. Capitularies, written by amanuenses of the Aachen chancellery, summed up the decisions taken. In this building also took place official ceremonies and the reception of embassies. Describing the coronation of Louis, son of Charlemagne, Ermold the Black states that there Charlemagne "spoke down from his golden seat."

The dimensions of the hall (1,000 m2) were suitable to the reception of several hundreds of people at the same time: although the building has been destroyed, it is known it was 47,42 metres long, 20,76 metres large and 21 metres high. The plan seems to be based upon the Roman aula palatina of Trier. The structure was made of brick, and the shape was that of a civil basilica with three apses: the largest one (17,2 m), located to the West, was dedicated to the king and his suite. The two other apses, to the North and South, were smaller. Light entered through two rows of windows. The inside was probably decorated with paintings depicting heroes both from the Ancient times and contemporary. A wooden gallery girdled the building between the two rows of windows. From this gallery could be seen the market that was held North of the Palace. A gallery with porticos on the southern side of the hall gave access to the building. The southern apse cut through the middle of this entrance.

Palatine Chapel

Description 

The Palatine Chapel was located at the other side of the palace complex, at the South. A stone gallery linked it to the aula regia. It symbolized another aspect of Charlemagne's power, religious power. Legend has it that the building was consecrated in 805 by Pope Leo III, in honour of the Virgin Mary, Mother of Christ.

Several buildings used by the clerics of the chapel were arranged in the shape of a latin cross: a curia in the East, offices in the North and South, and a projecting part (Westbau) and an atrium with exedrae in the West. But the center piece was the chapel, covered with a 16,54 meters wide and 31 meters high octagonal cupola. Eight massive pillars receive the thrust of large arcades. The nave on the first floor, located under the cupola, is surrounded by an aisle; here stood the Palace servants.

The two additional floors (tribunes) open on the central space through semicircular arches supported by columns. The inner side takes the shape of an octagon whereas the outer side develops into a sixteen-sided polygon. The chapel had two choirs located in the East and West. The king sat on a throne made of white marble plates, in the West of the second floor, surrounded by his closer courtiers. Thus he had a view on the three altars: that of the Savior right in front of him, that of the Virgin Mary on the first floor and that of Saint Peter in the far end of the Western choir.

Charlemagne wanted his chapel to be magnificently decorated, so he had massive bronze doors made in a foundry near Aachen. The walls were covered with marble and polychrome stone. The columns, still visible today, were taken from buildings in Ravenna and Rome, with the Pope's permission.

The walls and cupola were covered with mosaic, enhanced by both artificial lights and exterior light coming in through the windows. Eginhard provides a description of the inside in his Life of Charlemagne (c. 825–826):

Symbolism 
Odo of Metz applied the Christian symbolism for figures and numbers. The building was conceived as a representation of the heavenly Jerusalem, the Kingdom of God, as described in the Apocalypse. The outer perimeter of the cupola measures exactly 144 Carolingian feet whereas that of the heavenly Jerusalem, ideal city drawn by angels, is of 144 cubits. The mosaic of the cupola, hidden today behind a 19th-century restoration, showed Christ in Majesty with the 24 elders of the Apocalypse. Other mosaics, on the vaults of the aisle, takes up this subject by representing the heavenly Jerusalem. Charlemagne's throne, located in the West of the second floor, was placed on the seventh step of a platform.

Other buildings

Treasury and archives 
The treasury and archives of the palace were located in a tower tied to the great hall, in the North of the complex. The chamberman was the officer liable for the rulers' treasury and wardrobe. Finance administration fell on the archichaplain, assisted by a treasurer. The treasury gathered gifts brought by the kingdom's important people during the general assemblies or by foreign envoys. This made up an heterogeneous collection of objects ranging from precious books to weapons and clothing. The king would also buy items from merchants visiting Aachen.

The chancellor was liable for the archives. The chancellery employed several scribes and notaries who wrote down diplomas, capitularies and royal correspondence. Agents of the king's offices were mostly clergymen of the chapel.

Gallery 

The covered gallery was a hundred meters long. It linked the council hall to the chapel; a monumental porch in its middle was used as the main entrance. A room for legal hearing was located on the second floor. The king dispensed justice in this place, although affairs in which important people were involved were handled in the aula regia. When the king was away, this task fell on the count of the Palace. The building was also probably used as a garrison.

Thermae 

The thermal complex, located in the Southeast, measured 50 acres and included several buildings near the sources of the Emperor and Quirinus. Eginhard mentions a swimming pool that could accommodate one hundred swimmers at a time:

Other buildings for other functions 

The other buildings are not easy to identify because of the lack of detailed enough written accounts. Charlemagne's and his family's apartments seem to have been located in the north-eastern part of the palace complex; his room may have been on the second floor. Some of the servants of the palace must have lived in the western part, and some in the city. The Emperor is said to have owned a library but its exact location is hard to assess. The palace also housed other areas dedicated to artistic creation: a scriptorium that saw the writing of several precious manuscripts (Drogo Sacramentary, Godescalc Evangelistary…), a goldsmith workshop and  an ivory workshop. There was also a mint that was still operational in the 13th century.

The palace also housed the literary activities of the Palace Academy. This circle of scholars did not gather in a definite building: Charlemagne liked to listen to poems while he was swimming and eating. The Palace school provided education to the ruler's children and the "nourished ones" (nutriti in Latin), aristocrat sons that were to serve the king.

Outside of the palace complex were also a gynaeceum, barracks, a hospice, a hunting park and a menagerie in which lived the elephant Abul-Abbas, given by Baghdad Caliph Harun al-Rashid. Ermoldus Nigellus describes the place in his Poems on Louis the Pious (first half of the 9th century).

The place was frequented everyday by crowds of people: courtiers, scholars, aristocrats, merchants but also beggars and poor people that came to ask for charity. Internal affairs were the task of officers such as butler, le seneschal, the chamberman.

Symbolic interpretation of the Palace

Roman legacy and Byzantine model 

The palace borrows several elements of Roman civilization. The Aula Palatina follows a basilical plan. Basilicas in ancient times were public buildings where the city's affairs were discussed. The chapel follows models from ancient Rome: grids exhibit antique decorations (acanthus) and columns are topped by Corinthian capitals. The Emperor was buried in the Palatine Chapel within a 2nd-century marble sarcophagus decorated with a depiction of the abduction of Proserpina. Scholars of Charlemagne's time nicknamed Aachen «the Second Rome».

Charlemagne wished to compete with another Emperor of his time: Basileus of Constantinople. The cupola and mosaics of the chapel are Byzantine elements. The plan itself is inspired by the Basilica of San Vitale in Ravenna, built by Justinian I in the 6th century. Other experts point to similarities with the Church of the Saints Sergius and Bacchus, Constantinople's Chrysotriklinos and the main throne room in the Great Palace of Constantinople. During religious offices, Charlemagne stood in the second floor gallery, as did the Emperor in Constantinople.

Odo of Metz was also likely inspired by the 8th-century Lombard Palace of Pavia where the chapel was decorated with mosaics and paintings. Although he may have travelled to Italy, it is unlikely that he visited Constantinople.

Frankish style 
Although many references to Roman and Byzantine models are visible in Aachen's buildings, Odo of Metz expressed his talent for Frankish architect and brought undeniably different elements. The palace is also distinguishable from Merovingian architecture by its large scale and the multiplicity of volumes. The vaulting of the chapel illustrates an original Carolingian expertise, especially in the ambulatory topped with a groin vault. Whereas Byzantine emperors sat in the east to watch offices, Charlemagne sat in the west. Lastly, wooden buildings and half-timbering techniques were typical of Northern Europe.

Charlemagne's palace was thus more than a copy of Classical and Byzantine models: it was rather a synthesis of various influences, as a reflection of the Carolingian Empire. Just like Carolingian Renaissance, the palace was a product of the assimilation of several cultures and legacies.

Imperial centralization and unity 
The layout of the palatine complex perfectly implemented the alliance between two powers: the spiritual power was represented by the chapel in the South and the temporal power by the Council Hall in the North. Both of these were linked by the gallery. Since Pepin the Short, Charlemagne's father, Carolingian kings were sacred and received their power from God. Charlemagne himself wanted to influence religious matters through his reforms and the numerous ecumenical council and synods held in Aachen. By establishing the seat of the power and the court in Aachen, Charlemagne knew he would be able to more easily supervise those close to him. The palace was the heart of the capital city, gathering dignitaries from all over the Empire.

After Charlemagne

Model for other palaces 

It is difficult to know whether other Carolingian palaces did imitate that of Aachen, as most of them have been destroyed. However, the constructions of Aachen were not the only ones undertaken under Charlemagne: 16 cathedrals, 232 monasteries and 65 royal palaces were built between 768 and 814.
The Palatine Chapel of Aachen seems to have been imitated by several other buildings of the same kind: The octagonal oratory of Germigny-des-Prés, built in the early 9th century for Theodulf of Orléans seems to have been directly related. The Collegiate church of Liège was built in the 10th century following the plan of the palatine chapel. Ottmarsheim church in Alsace also adopts a centered plan but was built later (11th century). The influence of Aachen's chapel is also found in Compiègne and in other German religious buildings (such as the Abbey church of Essen).

Palace history after Charlemagne 
Charlemagne was buried in the chapel in 814. His son and successor, Emperor Louis the Pious, used the palace of Aachen without making it his exclusive residence. He used to stay there from winter until Easter. Several important Councils were held in Aix in the early 9th century. Those of 817 and 836 took place in the buildings adjacent to the chapel. In 817, Louis the Pious had his elder son Lothair in the presence of the Frankish people.

Following the Treaty of Verdun in 843, the Carolingian Empire was split into three kingdoms. Aachen was then incorporated into Middle Francia. Lothair I (840–855) and Lothair II (855–869) lived in the palace. When he died, the palace lost its political and cultural significance. Lotharingia became a field of rivalry between the kings of West and East Francia. It was split several times and finally fell under the control of Germany under Henry I the Fowler (876–936).

Yet the memory of Charlemagne's Empire remained fresh and became a symbol of German power. In the 10th century, Otto I (912–973) was crowned King of Germany in Aachen (936). The three-part ceremony took place in several locations within the palace: first in the courtyard (election by the dukes), then in the chapel (handing of the insignia of the Kingdom), finally in the palace (banquet). During the ceremony, Otto sat on Charlemagne's throne. Afterwards, and until the 16th century, all the German Emperors were crowned firstly in Aachen and then in Rome, which highlights the attachment to Charlemagne's political legacy. The Golden Bull of 1356 confirmed that coronations were to take place in the palatine chapel.

Otto II (955–983) lived in Aachen with his wife Theophanu. In the summer of 978 Lothair of France led a raid on Aachen but the Imperial family avoided capture. Relating these events, Richer of Reims states the existence of a bronze eagle, the exact location of which is unknown:

In 881, a Viking raid damaged the palace and the chapel. In 1000, the Holy Roman Emperor Otto III had Charlemagne's tomb opened. According to two 11th-century chroniclers, he would have been found sitting on his throne, wearing his crown and holding his sceptre. However, Eginhard does not mention this in his biography of the Emperor. At the same time the veneration of Charlemagne began to attract pilgrims to the chapel. In the 12th century, Frederick Barbarossa placed the body of the Carolingian Emperor into a reliquary and interceded with the Pope for his  canonization; the relics were scattered across the empire. The treasure of Aachen began to grow with numerous gifts from French and German kings and princes.

Between 1355 and 1414, an apse was added to the east end of the chapel. The City Hall was built from 1267 on the site of the Council Hall. During the French Revolution, the French occupied Aachen and looted its treasure. Before choosing Notre-Dame de Paris, Napoleon I had considered for a time holding his Imperial Coronation in Aachen. The chapel was restored in 1884. In 1978 the cathedral, including the chapel, was listed as a World Heritage Site by UNESCO.

See also 
 Aachen
 Carolingian art
 Carolingian Empire
 Palatine Chapel in Aachen

Notes

References 

 Alain Erlande-Brandeburg, Anne-Bénédicte Erlande-Brandeburg, Histoire de l’architecture française, tome 1 : du Moyen Âge à la Renaissance, IVe – XVIe siècle, 1999, Paris, éditions du Patrimoine, .
 Gabrielle Démians D’Archimbaud, Histoire artistique de l’Occident médiéval, Paris, Colin, 3e édition, 1968, 1992, .
 Marcel Durliat, Des barbares à l’an Mil, Paris, éditions citadelles et Mazenod, 1985, .
 Jean Favier, Charlemagne, Paris, Fayard, 1999, .
 Jean Hubert, Jean Porcher, W. F. Volbach, L’empire carolingien, Paris, Gallimard, 1968
 Félix Kreush, « La Chapelle palatine de Charlemagne à Aix », dans Les Dossiers d'archéologie, n°30, 1978, pages 14–23.
 Pierre Riché, La Vie quotidienne dans l’Empire carolingien, Paris, Hachette, 1973
 Pierre Riché, Les Carolingiens. Une famille qui fit l’Europe, Paris, Hachette, 1983, .

External links 

  Aachen cathedral in pictures

Buildings and structures completed in the 8th century
Palaces in North Rhine-Westphalia
Carolingian architecture
Charlemagne
Aachen
Landmarks in Germany
History of Aachen
Aachen
Articles containing video clips